Swanscombe railway station is a railway station that serves the village of Swanscombe in north Kent, England.

History 
The first station, a small wooden halt, was opened in 1908.

The station is awkwardly located in a very deep chalk cutting, with a long staircase from the booking office leading to the up platform. The down platform is reached across a road overbridge and down another long flight of stairs. There is no step-free access to either platform. Passengers requiring step-free access are advised to use Greenhithe railway station. 

The ticket office, on the 'up' side at road level, is located in a recent building. This is staffed only during part of the day; at other times a ticket machine is available and is located outside the ticket office. Until the 1980s, separate staffed ticket offices were located in buildings on each platform, suitably equipped with ticketing machinery. It was named and signed as Swanscombe Halt until the 1980s.

Services 

The typical off-peak service in trains per hour is:
 2 tph to London Charing Cross via 
 2 tph to  via  and 
 2 tph to 
 2 tph to  via 

References

External links 

Railway stations in Kent
DfT Category E stations
Transport in the Borough of Dartford
Former South Eastern Railway (UK) stations
Former Southern Railway (UK) stations
Railway stations in Great Britain opened in 1908
Railway stations in Great Britain closed in 1930
Railway stations in Great Britain opened in 1930
Railway stations served by Southeastern
Railway stations served by Govia Thameslink Railway